North Pickens Airport  is a county-owned public-use airport in Pickens County, Alabama, United States. It is located one nautical mile (1.15 mi, 1.85 km) north of the central business district of Reform, Alabama. The airport is included in the FAA's National Plan of Integrated Airport Systems for 2011–2015, which categorized it as a general aviation facility.

Facilities and aircraft 
It has one runway designated 1/19 with an asphalt surface measuring 5,144 by 80 feet (1,568 x 24 m).

For the 12-month period ending November 2, 2009, the airport had 3,466 general aviation aircraft operations, an average of 288 per month. At that time there were 11 aircraft based at this airport: 64% single-engine, 18% multi-engine and 18% jet.

References

External links 
 

Airports in Alabama
Transportation buildings and structures in Pickens County, Alabama